Goroka Airport is an airport in Goroka, Papua New Guinea.

Domestic terminal 
The Terminal operates 2 flights daily to Port Moresby.  The departure lounge contains a snack shop and an Avis car hire center.

An Air Niugini Travel Agent operates beside the terminal.

Airlines and destinations

References

Airports in Papua New Guinea
Eastern Highlands Province